John Vrooman may refer to:
 John W. Vrooman, American lawyer, banker and politician from New York
 John Perry Vrooman, Ontario physician and political figure